Joaquim Maria Moreira Cardozo (August 26, 1897 – November 4, 1978), known as Joaquim Cardozo, was a Brazilian structural engineer, poet, short-story writer, and editor.

Cardozo moved to Rio de Janeiro in 1940 and worked with the architect Oscar Niemeyer on some of his major works, including on the Pampulha Modern Ensemble which is now a UNESCO World Heritage Site. Other works include the Monument to the Dead of World War II.

Among his most famous poems is the 1924 Recife morto.

References

1897 births
1978 deaths
Brazilian poets
Structural engineers
20th-century Brazilian engineers
People from Recife